Mardaani is a 2014 Indian Hindi-language action thriller film directed by Pradeep Sarkar and produced by Aditya Chopra. The film stars Rani Mukerji, with Jisshu Sengupta, Tahir Raj Bhasin and Saanand Verma in supporting roles. The narrative revolves around Shivani Shivaji Roy, a policewoman whose interest in the case of a kidnapped teenage girl leads her to uncover secrets of human trafficking by the Indian mafia.

Released theatrically on 22 August 2014, the film received positive reviews, with praise for Mukerji's performance, and emerged as a commercial success. It was followed by a sequel titled Mardaani 2 in 2019. Following the success of Mardaani 2, the production house announced in December 2019, a possible third installment in the Mardaani series, titled Mardaani 3, with Rani Mukerji reprising the role of Shivani Shivaji Roy.

Plot 
The film opens with a secret police operation orchestrated by Shivani Shivaji Roy, a dedicated Crime Branch Senior Inspector of the Mumbai Police, in order to catch a pimp named Rahman from his hideout. Shivani barges in with her team and arrests Rahman, and rescues his mistress. Shivani lives with her husband, Dr. Bikram Roy, and niece, Meera. Prior to the film, she rescued an orphaned girl named Pyaari from her uncle, who was about to sell her, and started looking after her like her own daughter. One day, Shivani finds out that Pyaari has been missing from her shelter home from five days and begins an investigation, where she finds out that the mastermind behind this kidnapping is a Delhi-based kingpin named Karan Rastogi (Tahir Raj Bhasin), who runs a cartel involving child trafficking and drugs. Shivani takes the task personally, going beyond her job and duties to nab Karan.

Shivani forces Rahman to reveal the names of Karan's associates and comes across Sunny Katyal (Anant Vidhaat Sharma), a car-dealer who operates Karan's trafficking business in Mumbai. Karan discovers that Shivani is monitoring his cartel's activities and tries to have Katyal killed for becoming a liability. However, Shivani saves Katyal, and he agrees to help her nab Karan. Determined to catch him, Shivani tracks down Karan's aide, Wakeel. Karan, angered, makes sure that Pyaari is sold and raped every day. As a warning, he spreads fake news that Shivani's husband has misused his profession as a doctor to molest a female patient, causing Bikram to be thrown off-duty. He then chops off one of Pyaari's fingers and sends it to Shivani's house in a gift box. Meanwhile, Karan's right-hand man Mattu (Aman Uppal) gets a contract to host a party full of prostitutes from a man named Tandon on the behalf of a minister in Delhi, Taneja ji. Mattu also kills one of the girls in Karan's brothel at his orders when she contracts dengue, thus further scaring Pyaari.

Shivani travels to Delhi and sets up a trap involving decoy drug dealers from Nigeria, who pretend to offer expensive and rare South American cocaine to Karan and Wakeel. As they are negotiating, Shivani barges in with her team. While Karan escapes, Wakeel tries to erase evidence by destroying his mobile phone's SIM card, then commits suicide. Shivani and her Delhi-based teammate Balwinder Singh Sodhi track down a tailor who knew Wakeel from a long time. He reveals that a prostitute named Meenu Rastogi was Wakeel's closest associate. Shivani's continued investigation leads her to Karan's house, where Meenu, revealing herself as Karan's mother, sedates her.

She is abducted and brought to Karan's party. There, Shivani reunites with Pyaari, where she and the other girls are forced to work as prostitutes. Karan invites Taneja ji and allows him to rape Shivani. However, she escapes and ruthlessly beats Taneja. Shivani single-handedly confronts the situation, forcing Karan into a small room and rescuing the girls. She challenges Karan to fight her when he teases her for being a woman and beats him. Feeling that he might escape the law, given the corrupt police and judicial system, she hands Karan over to the girls, who trample him to death. Subsequently, Sodhi and the entire team barges in and arrest Mattu, Tandon and Karan’s gang members. Meenu gets paralyzed by shock while Taneja manages to survive, before being sentenced to life imprisonment.

Cast 
 Rani Mukerji as Senior Inspector Shivani Shivaji Roy, Mumbai Crime Branch Officer
 Tahir Raj Bhasin as Karan 'Walt' Rastogi, a criminal and a drug addict
 Jisshu Sengupta as Dr. Bikram Roy (Shivani's husband)
 Anant Vidhaat Sharma as Sunny Katyal
 Priyanka Sharma as Pyaari
 Mikhail Yawalkar as SI Balwinder Singh Sodhi 
 Avneet Kaur as Meera
 Ahad Ali Aamir as Minhas
 Saanand Verma as Kapil
 Mona Ambegaonkar as Meenu Rastogi, Walt's mother
 Mahika Sharma as a victim
 Peter Muxka Manuel as Mboso
 Anil George as Lawyer aka Vakeel Sahab, Walt's assistant
 Saheb Das Manikpuri as Pakya
 Sanjay Taneja as Chief Minister Taneja

Production

Development 
In January 2014, Rani Mukerji who plays the role of a crime branch officer in the film met Mumbai Police Crime Branch chief as part of research for her role. It was speculated that her role was inspired by IPS officer Meera Borwankar, who was also an investigation officer in the Mumbai 26/11 case. For her role, Mukerji trained in Krav Maga, a street-fighting, self-defence system developed for the Israeli military. It was directed by Pradeep Sarkar and written by Gopi Puthran.
The cinematographer for the movie was Polish Artur Żurawski.

Soundtrack

Marketing and release 
The official trailer of the film was released on 24 June 2014. The Central Board of Film Certification required that the use of a profanity and scene depicting rape of a teenage girl be removed from the trailer.

Because of the film's social message and the impact it can provide to Indian women, the film has been given tax free status in Madhya Pradesh by Chief Minister Shivraj Singh Chouhan in its first week of release. This was followed by Uttar Pradesh and Maharashtra also giving the film a tax free status.

In Pakistan, Central Board of Film Censors gave the film adult Certificate but objected on few scenes. The Board asked for seven cuts and wanted certain scenes to be blurred, but the film makers were of the view that "it would lead to loss of the essence of the narration of the movie" and hence decided not to screen the movie in Pakistan.

Mardaani premiered in Poland at Warsaw's Kino Muranów theatre, one of the oldest art house theatres in the country, on 29 January 2015. The film received a standing ovation from the audience, and Rani Mukerji was congratulated by one and all for her exceptional performance and for being a part of such a relevant and sensitive film.

Reception

Critical response 
Mid-Day gave Mardaani four stars out of five and said Pradeep Sarkar "offers a pragmatic and compelling story of what it is to chase down the bad guy with Rani Mukerji at her mercurial best as an inspector who simply won't give up". Subhash K. Jha also gave the film four stars out of five, praising the use of the film's soundtrack, saying, "Mardaani cleans out the noises and yet retains a high decibel of authenticity in the complementary relationship between sight and sound". Taran Adarsh of Bollywood Hungama wrote, "[E]nacting the part of the tough-talking cop who goes in pursuit of those who run the sex trafficking ring, Rani strikes a true to life, forceful pose and also lends her character the much-needed intensity, strength and dignity. The agony that drives her forward is visible on her face and is one of the prime reasons that makes this story easy to swallow".

Box office 
Koimoi states that Mardaanis net of 40 crore was double the amount invested in the film.

Awards and nominations

Sequel 

In December 2018, Yash Raj Films announced that a sequel Mardaani 2 will be made with writer Gopi Puthran directing this time, and Rani Mukerji reprising her role. The filming began in March 2019 and was released on 13 December 2019.

References

External links 
 
 

2014 action thriller films
2014 crime action films
2014 crime thriller films
2010s Hindi-language films
2014 films
2010s feminist films
Fictional portrayals of the Maharashtra Police
Films about child prostitution
Films about human trafficking in India
Films about prostitution in India
Films about rape in India
Films about women in India
Films scored by Salim–Sulaiman
Films set in Mumbai
Indian action thriller films
Indian crime action films
Indian crime thriller films
Indian feminist films
Indian police films
Yash Raj Films films
Films directed by Pradeep Sarkar